Štefan Žáry (12 December 1918 in Poniky – 25 August 2007 in Bratislava) was  a Slovak poet, prosaist, translator and essayist; author of erotic lyric poetry, patriotic and anti-war poems, reminiscential prose. In his patriotic poems, he expressed his disappointment of a civilization progress. He translated mainly French literature.

His works were initially related with surrealism, later he referred to folk and classical traditions. Notable works include collection of poems Srdcia na mozaike (1938), Meč a vavrin (1948), Smaragdové rúno (1977), Malá letná suita v štyroch vetách (1995), parodies of Slovak folk songs Satironikon (1990), novel Ktorýsi deň z konca leta (1998).

References

1918 births
2007 deaths
Slovak essayists
Slovak poets
Slovak translators
Slovak writers
Translators from French
Translators to Slovak
French–Slovak translators
20th-century poets
20th-century translators
20th-century essayists
Comenius University alumni
Czechoslovak poets